is a throwing technique described in The Canon of Judo as a reference technique and demonstrated by Kyuzo Mifune in the video, The Essence of Judo. This technique is unrecognised by the Kodokan; it is categorized as Yoko-sutemi (side sacrifice).  It is similar to Kata Guruma.

See also 
 Judo technique

External links
 Throwing techniques—Judoinfo.com

Judo technique
Throw (grappling)